In 1989, elections were held for the Congress of People's Deputies of the Soviet Union. The main elections were held on 26 March and a second round on 9 April. They were the first partially free nationwide elections held in the Soviet Union, and would prove to be the final national elections held as the country dissolved in 1991. The elections were followed by regional elections in 1990, the last legislative elections to take place in the country.

Background

In January 1987, Mikhail Gorbachev, General Secretary of the Communist Party of the Soviet Union (CPSU), announced the new policy of demokratizatsiya (democratization). Under this concept the electorate would have a choice between multiple candidates per constituency, although all candidates would still have to be members of the CPSU. The concept was introduced by Gorbachev to enable him to circumvent the CPSU hardliners who resisted his perestroika and glasnost reform campaigns, while still maintaining the Soviet Union as a one-party communist state.

In December 1988, the 1977 Soviet Constitution was amended to create a new legislative body, the Congress of People's Deputies (CPD), to replace the old Supreme Soviet of the Soviet Union. The Congress of People's Deputies consisted of 2,250 deputies. 750 deputies (one third) were reserved for the CPSU and its affiliated organizations, however, the remaining two-thirds would be elected under the principles of demokratizatsiya, with 750 under the system of the old Soviet of the Union (one deputy per 300,000 citizens) and 750 under the system of the old Soviet of Nationalities (an equal number of deputies for each of the fifteen Union Republics). Elections for the new legislature were set for March 1989.

The elections

While the majority of CPSU-endorsed candidates were elected (84 percent of the Congress consisted of the CPSU candidates by Gorbachev's estimate), over 300 candidates won out over the endorsed candidates. Among them were Boris Yeltsin, who won over the CPSU-endorsed candidate to represent Moscow's district with 89% of the vote. It was Yeltsin's first return to political power after resigning from the Politburo in 1987. On a union republic level Yeltsin was also later elected to the RSFSR's Congress and then, indirectly, to its Supreme Soviet. Anti-corruption prosecutor Telman Gdlyan, trapeze artist Valentin Dikul, ethnographer Galina Starovoytova, lawyer Anatoly Sobchak, physicist Andrei Sakharov, weightlifter Yury Vlasov, and hockey player Anatoli Firsov were among the other non-endorsed candidates who were elected to the CPD.

All in all, while the majority of seats were won by endorsed candidates, one Politburo member, five Central Committee members, and thirty five regional CPSU chiefs lost re-election to non-endorsed candidates. Gorbachev hailed the elections as a victory for perestroika and the election was praised in state media such as TASS and Izvestia, despite the strong opposition of hardliners within the Politburo and Central Committee.

Aftermath

The first session of the new Congress of People's Deputies opened in late May 1989. Although hardliners retained control of the chamber, the reformers used the legislature as a platform to debate and criticize the Soviet system, with the state media broadcasting their comments live and uncensored on television. Yeltsin managed to secure a seat on the reconstituted Supreme Soviet of the Soviet Union, and in the summer formed the first opposition, the Inter-Regional Deputies Group, formed of Russian nationalists and liberals. As it was the final legislative group in the Soviet Union, those elected in 1989 played a vital part in continuing reforms and the eventual fall of the Soviet Union two years later.

References
 – Russia
White, Stephen and Gordon Wightman. "Gorbachev's Reforms: The Soviet Elections of 1989." Parliamentary Affairs, 42 (1989): 560–581.
Tedin, Kent L. "Popular Support for Competitive Elections in the Soviet Union." Comparative Political Studies, 47 (July 1994): 241–271.
Remnick, David. 1994. Lenin's Tomb: The Last Days of the Soviet Empire. New York: Vintage Books, pp. 216–223.

External links
On This Day: 1989: Millions of Russians go to the polls on BBC
Gorbachev on 1989 in The Nation
Yeltsin and the Soviet Elections in Workers World

1989 elections in the Soviet Union
Soviet Union
Soviet Union
Legislative elections in the Soviet Union
Dissolution of the Soviet Union
One-party elections
Perestroika
March 1989 events in Europe
Mikhail Gorbachev
Boris Yeltsin